This page provides supplementary data to the article properties of water.

Further comprehensive authoritative data can be found at the NIST Webbook page on thermophysical properties of fluids.

Structure and properties

Thermodynamic properties

Liquid physical properties

Water/steam equilibrium properties

Vapor pressure formula for steam in equilibrium with liquid water:
 

where P is equilibrium vapor pressure in kPa, and T is temperature in kelvins.

For T = 273 K to 333 K: A = 7.2326; B = 1750.286; C = 38.1.

For T = 333 K to 423 K: A = 7.0917; B = 1668.21; C = 45.1.

Data in the table above is given for water–steam equilibria at various temperatures over the entire temperature range at which liquid water can exist. Pressure of the equilibrium is given in the second column in kPa. The third column is the heat content of each gram of the liquid phase relative to water at 0 °C. The fourth column is the heat of vaporization of each gram of liquid that changes to vapor. The fifth column is the work PΔV done by each gram of liquid that changes to vapor. The sixth column is the density of the vapor.

Melting point of ice at various pressures
Data obtained from CRC Handbook of Chemistry and Physics 44th ed., p. 2390

Table of various forms of ice

‡Ice XI triple point is theoretical and has never been obtained

Phase diagram

Water with dissolved NaCl

Note: ρ is density, n is refractive index at 589 nm, and η is viscosity, all at 20 °C; Teq is the equilibrium temperature between two phases: ice/liquid solution for Teq < 0–0.1 °C and NaCl/liquid solution for Teq above 0.1 °C.

Self-ionization

Spectral data

Self-diffusion coefficients

Additional data translated from German "Wasser (Stoffdaten)" page

The data that follows was copied and translated from the German language Wikipedia version of this page (which has moved to here). It provides supplementary physical, thermodynamic, and vapor pressure data, some of which is redundant with data in the tables above, and some of which is additional.

Physical and thermodynamic tables

In the following tables, values are temperature-dependent and to a lesser degree pressure-dependent, and are arranged by state of aggregation (s = solid, lq = liquid, g = gas), which are clearly a function of temperature and pressure. All of the data were computed from data given in "Formulation of the Thermodynamic Properties of Ordinary Water Substance for Scientific and General Use" (1984). This applies to:
 T – temperature in degrees Celsius
 V – specific volume in cubic decimeters per kilogram (1 dm3 is equivalent to 1 liter)
 H – specific enthalpy in kilojoules per kilogram
 U – specific internal energy in kilojoules per kilogram
 S – specific entropy in kilojoules per kilogram-kelvin
 cp – specific heat capacity at constant pressure in kilojoules per kilogram-kelvin
 γ – Thermal expansion coefficient as 10−3 per kelvin
 λ – Heat conductivity in milliwatts per meter-kelvin
 η – Viscosity in micropascal-seconds (1 cP = 1000 μPa·s)
 σ – surface tension in millinewtons per meter (equivalent to dyn/cm)

Standard conditions
In the following table, material data are given for standard pressure of 0.1 MPa (equivalent to 1 bar). Up to 99.63 °C (the boiling point of water at 0.1 MPa), at this pressure water exists as a liquid. Above that, it exists as water vapor. Note that the boiling point of 100.0 °C is at a pressure of 0.101325 MPa (1 atm), which is the average atmospheric pressure.

Triple point
In the following table, material data are given with a pressure of 611.7 Pa (equivalent to 0.006117 bar). Up to a temperature of 0.01 °C, the triple point of water, water normally exists as ice, except for supercooled water, for which one data point is tabulated here. At the triple point, ice can exist together with both liquid water and vapor. At higher temperatures, the data are for water vapor only.

Saturated vapor pressure

The following table is based on different, complementary sources and approximation formulas, whose values are of various quality and accuracy. The values in the temperature range of −100 °C to 100 °C were inferred from D. Sunday (1982) and are quite uniform and exact. The values in the temperature range of the boiling point of water up to the critical point (100 °C to 374 °C) are drawn from different sources and are substantially less accurate; hence they should be used only as approximate values.

To use the values correctly, consider the following points:
 The values apply only to smooth interfaces and in the absence other gases or gas mixtures such as air. Hence they apply only to pure phases and need a correction factor for systems in which air is present.
 The values were not computed according formulas widely used in the US, but using somewhat more exact formulas (see below), which can also be used to compute further values in the appropriate temperature ranges.
 The saturated vapor pressure over water in the temperature range of −100 °C to −50 °C is only extrapolated [Translator's note: Supercooled liquid water is not known to exist below −42 °C].
 The values have various units (Pa, hPa or bar), which must be considered when reading them.

Formulas

The table values for −100 °C to 100 °C were computed by the following formulas, where T is in kelvins and vapor pressures, Pw and Pi, are in pascals.

Over liquid water

loge(Pw) = −6094.4642 T−1 + 21.1249952 − 2.724552×10−2 T + 1.6853396×10−5 T2 + 2.4575506 loge(T)

For temperature range: 173.15 K to 373.15 K or equivalently −100 °C to 100 °C

Over ice
loge(Pi) = −5504.4088 T−1 − 3.5704628 − 1.7337458×10−2 T + 6.5204209×10−6 T2 + 6.1295027 loge(T)

For temperature range: 173.15 K to 273.15 K or equivalently −100 °C to 0 °C

At triple point

An important basic value, which is not registered in the table, is the saturated vapor pressure at the triple point of water. The internationally accepted value according to measurements of Guildner, Johnson and Jones (1976) amounts to:

Pw(ttp = 0.01 °C) = 611.657 Pa ± 0.010 Pa at (1 − α) = 99%

Magnetic susceptibility 
Accepted standardized value of the magnetic susceptibility of water at 20 °C (room temperature) is −12.97 cm3/mol.

Accepted standardized value of the magnetic susceptibility of water at 20 °C (room temperature) is −0.702 cm3/g.

See also

 Properties of water

References

Bibliography

External links
 Microwave Spectrum (by NIST)
 Water properties by Martin Chaplin, London South Bank University.

Chemical data pages
Water chemistry
Chemical data pages cleanup